Anatoli Starostin (born 18 January 1960) is a former Soviet modern pentathlete and Olympic champion.

Olympics
Starostin competed for the Soviet Union at the 1980 Summer Olympics in Moscow, where he won an individual gold medal, and a team gold medal with the Soviet team. He won a team silver medal with the Unified team at the 1992 Summer Olympics in Barcelona.

References

1960 births
Living people
Russian male modern pentathletes
Soviet male modern pentathletes
Olympic modern pentathletes of the Soviet Union
Olympic modern pentathletes of the Unified Team
Modern pentathletes at the 1980 Summer Olympics
Modern pentathletes at the 1992 Summer Olympics
Olympic gold medalists for the Soviet Union
Olympic silver medalists for the Unified Team
Olympic medalists in modern pentathlon
Medalists at the 1992 Summer Olympics
Medalists at the 1980 Summer Olympics